Tag und Nacht may refer to:
Tag und Nacht (film), a 2011 Austrian film
Tag und Nacht (album), a 2006 album by Schiller